Minnesota State Highway 30 (MN 30) is a  highway in southwest and southeast Minnesota, which runs from South Dakota Highway 34 at the South Dakota state line near Airlie, west of Pipestone, and continues to its eastern terminus at its intersection with Minnesota Highway 43 in Rushford.

Route description

State Highway 30 serves as an east–west route between Pipestone, Slayton, St. James, Stewartville, Chatfield, and Rushford.

Highway 30 parallels U.S. Highway 14 and Interstate Highway 90 throughout its route.

The Pipestone National Monument is located immediately north of Highway 30 in Pipestone.

Lake Shetek State Park is located near Highway 30 in Murray County on the shore of Lake Shetek.  The park is located immediately north of the town of Currie and northeast of Slayton.

Highway 30 passes through the Richard J. Dorer Memorial Hardwood State Forest in Olmsted and Fillmore counties.

History
State Highway 30 was established in 1933, originally running from Highway 15 to Rushford. It replaced former State Highway 41 from Blooming Prairie to Hayfield. The road was completely gravel at this time except where it overlapped other highways.

By 1946, the road was still unpaved except for short sections in and near some towns. The first extended paving was done from Cummingsville to Rushford in 1948 and 1949. The remainder of the highway was paved throughout the 1950s; by 1960 it was fully paved. In 1955, the highway was re-routed east of Chatfield to overlap with Highway 74.

In 1961, Highway 30 was extended westward, along the route of what had previously been State Highway 47. (This highway number was simultaneously re-used on another highway in east-central Minnesota.) This extension was paved except for the section between U.S. 71 and the Cottonwood-Watonwan county line; this section was paved in 1965.

Highway 47 was originally established November 2, 1920 from Pipestone to Slayton. It was extended west to the South Dakota state line and east to Highway 4 north of St. James in 1933. The entire highway was gravel at this time. In 1939, it was realigned to take a direct route to Darfur from U.S. 71, bypassing Comfrey. By 1940, the roadway was paved from the state line to Westbrook. Paving from Westbrook to U.S. 71 was performed in 1950 and 1951,  and through Watonwan County in 1955.

In the late 1970s, Highway 30's overlap with Highway 60 was upgraded to a four-lane expressway.

Future
There are plans to reroute the highway into the City of Rochester to better serve the Rochester International Airport and improve conditions on U.S. 63.

Major intersections

References

External links

 Highway 30 at The Unofficial Minnesota Highways Page

030
Transportation in Pipestone County, Minnesota
Transportation in Murray County, Minnesota
Transportation in Cottonwood County, Minnesota
Transportation in Watonwan County, Minnesota
Transportation in Blue Earth County, Minnesota
Transportation in Waseca County, Minnesota
Transportation in Steele County, Minnesota
Transportation in Dodge County, Minnesota
Transportation in Olmsted County, Minnesota
Transportation in Fillmore County, Minnesota